Boysen may refer to:

People
 Boysen (surname), list of people with the surname

Other uses
Boysen Dam, rockfill dam in Wyoming, U.S.
Boysen Reservoir, reservoir formed by Boysen Dam
Boysen State Park, public recreation area surrounding the Boysen Reservoir
Bert och Boysen, Swedish diary novel written by Anders Jacobsson and Sören Olsson